Bjørn Arild Levernes (born 27 April 1972) is a retired Norwegian football midfielder.

He started his youth career in Kurland FK and his senior career in Strømmen IF. He then played first-tier football for ten straight years, in 1993–94 for Kongsvinger and 1995–2002 for Vålerenga.  He was also a squad member in 2003, but did not play a single match following serious injury. His greatest successes in Vålerenga were victories in the 1997 and 2002 Norwegian Football Cup Final, and following the first victory, Vålerenga's run in the 1998–99 UEFA Cup Winners' Cup. Levernes became match winner of both the 2002 Norwegian Football Cup Final and the home leg against Beşiktaş in the Cup Winners' Cup.

Levernes was also capped for Norway on youth level, as well as senior level on a 1995 tour of the Caribbean.

References

1972 births
Living people
People from Skedsmo
Norwegian footballers
Strømmen IF players
Kongsvinger IL Toppfotball players
Vålerenga Fotball players
Norwegian First Division players
Eliteserien players
Association football midfielders
Norway youth international footballers
Norway under-21 international footballers
Norway international footballers
Sportspeople from Viken (county)